is the 10th single by the Japanese female idol group Momoiro Clover Z, released on November 6, 2013.

Release details and philosophical reference
The single was released in two versions: a limited edition and a regular edition. The limited edition came with a DVD featuring the music video for the title track, but contains less songs on the CD in comparison to the regular CD-only edition. The tour of the same name (Momoiro Clover Z Japan Tour 2013 "Gounn") is being held from September 28.

"Gounn" is a Buddhism terminology, which refers to the 5 elements of humans' bodies and souls, the number 5 coincides with the total number of members in Momoiro Clover Z at the time.

Track listing

Limited edition

Regular edition

Chart performance

References

External links 
 Momoiro Clover Z 10th single "Gounn" special site 
 Profiles at King Records
 Limited edition
 Regular edition

2013 singles
Japanese-language songs
Momoiro Clover Z songs
King Records (Japan) singles
2013 songs